Glencullen is a village and townland in the county of Dún Laoghaire–Rathdown in south County Dublin, Ireland. It is also the name of the valley above one end of which the village sits, and from which it takes its name, and is on the R116 road, on the slopes of Two Rock Mountain.

Glencullen is in the civil parish of Kilternan and the barony and Poor Law Union of Rathdown.

Heritage

There is a Bronze Age wedge tomb at Ballyedmonduff on the south-eastern slope of Two Rock Mountain. It is known locally as the giants grave. It is a rectangular chamber divided into three parts surrounded by a U-shaped double-walled kerb filled with stones. The tomb was excavated in the 1940s by Seán P. Ó Riordáin and Ruaidhrí De Valera when cremated bone, a polished stone hammer, flints and pottery were found.

Below Two Rock Mountain is the prominent South Dublin landmark of Three Rock Mountain, complete with its Communications Masts, some of which are visible from Glencullen.

Glencullen also has an important standing stone at Newtown Hill and also has an earthen burial mound dating from the same period as the wedge tomb at Ballyedmonduff. Glencullen Standing Stone also known as Queen Mab is also located in the village.

Entertainment
At the centre of the village is Johnnie Fox's Pub, which was established in 1798, the year of the Irish Rebellion led by Theobald Wolfe Tone. The pub has an active business in Irish-themed entertainment, and draws substantial coach and car traffic.

Amenities
The part-time library is housed in a Carnegie building, dating back to 1907.

St. Patrick's National School (a national primary school) is in Glencullen.

Sport
The Stars of Erin (Irish: Réaltaí na hÉireann ) are the local Gaelic Athletic Association club. They were founded in 1903 and have two All Ireland Club titles, and are holders of the Paddy Mulligan Cup.

There is a nine-hole golf course and a mountain bike park (formerly a golf course).

Transport
The  number 44B Dublin Bus service runs from the Dundrum Luas station to Glencullen.
There is also a private coach service run by the pub Johnnie Fox's nearby from Dublin City Centre to the pub.

History
In August 1841 the village was the centre of the agitation movement against Robert Peel's government when the "cabinet council" was convened at Fitzsimon's seat. Attendees included Viscount Morpeth and Frederick Romilly. During the Fenian Insurrection of 1867, the nine policemen of Glencullen barracks surrendered to the Irish Republic.

People
Glencullen was home to the politician Christopher Fitzsimon, son-in-law of Daniel O'Connell

Glencullen features heavily in Dennis Kennedy's memoirs entitled Square Peg.

See also
 List of towns and villages in Ireland

References

Towns and villages in Dún Laoghaire–Rathdown